Alice Vickery (also known as A. Vickery Drysdale and A. Drysdale Vickery; 1844 – 12 January 1929) was an English physician, campaigner for women's rights, and the first British woman to qualify as a chemist and pharmacist. She and her life partner, Charles Robert Drysdale, also a physician, actively supported a number of causes, including free love, birth control, and destigmatisation of illegitimacy.

Education and marriage 

Vickery was born in Devon in 1844 to a piano maker and organ builder. By 1861, she had moved to South London. Vickery began her medical career at the Ladies' Medical College in 1869. There she met the lecturer Charles Robert Drysdale and started a relationship with him. They never married, as they both agreed with his brother George (also a neo-Malthusian physician) that marriage was "legal prostitution". The society, however, generally presumed that the pair were married; had their contemporaries known that they were in a free union, their careers likely would have suffered. Vickery sometimes added Drysdale's name to her own, referring to herself both as "Dr. Vickery Drysdale" and as "Dr. Drysdale Vickery".

In 1873, Vickery obtained a midwife's degree from the Obstetrical Society. On 18 June the same year, she passed the Royal Pharmaceutical Society's exam and became the first qualified female chemist and druggist. Afterward, Vickers went to study medicine at the University of Paris, as women were not allowed to attend any British medical school. There she gave birth to her first child, Charles Vickery Drysdale. The UK Medical Act 1876 allowed women to obtain medical degrees, and Vickery returned to England in 1877. In 1880, she became one of five women who qualified as physicians in the kingdom, obtaining her degree from the London School of Medicine for Women, and started practising medicine. In August 1881 her second son, George Vickery Drysdale was born.

Activism 

Vickery became a member of the Malthusian League and an outspoken supporter of birth control after the trial of Annie Besant and Charles Bradlaugh, who were arrested for publishing a book about contraception in 1877. When she was called to testify at the trial, she spoke about the dangers of too frequent childbirths and of using over-lactation as a contraception method. She had to temporarily withdraw from the League, however, because the London Medical School for Women did not approve of her activities. She resumed membership in 1880, when she obtained her degree, and spent the following decade lecturing about birth control as a key element to the emancipation of women. At the same time, she actively opposed the Contagious Diseases Acts.

Both Vickery and Drysdale joined the Legitimation League, set up in 1893, and campaigned for equal rights for children born out of wedlock. Vickery felt that the organisation "did not go far enough" until it started advocating free love. She was successively a member of the National Society for Women's Suffrage, the Women's Social and Political Union, and the Women's Freedom League. After Drysdale's death in 1907, Vickery continued practising as a physician and succeeded him as president of the Malthusian League, while their elder son Charles and daughter-in-law Bessie became the new editors of the journal Malthusian. Soon afterward, she became one of the first members of the Eugenics Education Society.

Later years 

Vickery moved to Brighton in 1923 to be near her elder son. She regularly addressed meetings of the local branch of the Women's Freedom League. She died of pneumonia on 12 January 1929, a few days after delivering an address that became her final public presentation. She was buried with Charles Robert Drysdale in Brookwood Cemetery.

Family

Her life-partner was Dr Charles Robert Drysdale. Their sons were Charles Vickery Drysdale FRSE (1874-1961) and George Vickery Drysdale (1881).

References

External links
 
 
 

1844 births
1929 deaths
Alumni of the London School of Medicine for Women
English women medical doctors
British birth control activists
Deaths from pneumonia in England
Free love advocates
Burials at Brookwood Cemetery
Medical doctors from Devon
Women of the Victorian era